The Samsung NX200 is a 20.3 effective megapixel APS-C crop CMOS mirrorless interchangeable lens digital camera made by Samsung. It was announced on September 1, 2011.

Changes from NX100

 Higher resolution movies. 1080p @ 30fps vs 720p @ 30fps
 Shoots faster. 7 fps vs 3 fps
 Higher maximum light sensitivity. 12,800 ISO vs 3,200 ISO
 Higher sensor resolution. 20 MP vs 14 MP
 Lighter. 220g vs 282g
 Smaller. 117x63x36 mm	vs 120x71x35 mm
 Smart Shoe (for add-on EVF compatibility) has been removed.
 Battery life (CIPA standard) shorter. NX200 (320 shots) | NX100 (420 shots)

See also
 Samsung NX series
Samsung NX-mount

References

External links and reviews 
 Review at samsungnx200.org
 Review at dpreview.com
 Review at Imaging Resource
 Samsung NX200 vs Samsung NX100 comparison at snapsort.com

NX200
Live-preview digital cameras
Cameras introduced in 2011